Maren Orth (née Kock; born 22 June 1990) is a German middle-distance runner. She competed in the 1500 metres at the 2016 European Athletics Championships.

In March 2017, she married fellow German distance runner, Florian Orth.

References

External links

1990 births
Living people
German female middle-distance runners
Place of birth missing (living people)
Athletes (track and field) at the 2016 Summer Olympics
Olympic athletes of Germany
21st-century German women